Im Ae-ji (born May 11, 1999) is a South Korean amateur boxer. She competed in the 2020 Summer Olympics.

References

External links
 

South Korean women boxers
Olympic boxers of South Korea
Boxers at the 2020 Summer Olympics
Sportspeople from South Jeolla Province
1999 births
Living people
Asian Games competitors for South Korea
Boxers at the 2018 Asian Games